Italy competed at the 1979 European Athletics Indoor Championships in Vienna, Austria, from 24 to 25 February 1979.

Medalists

Top eight
Seven Italian athletes reached the top eight in this edition of the championships.
Men

Women

See also
 Italy national athletics team

References

External links
 EAA official site 

1979
1979 European Athletics Indoor Championships
1979 in Italian sport